Medulla is an unincorporated community and census-designated place (CDP) in western Polk County, Florida, United States. It is part of the Lakeland–Winter Haven Metropolitan Statistical Area. Medulla is an affluent residential community located south of the Lakeland city limits, and north of the Mulberry city limits. Medulla neighbors Lakeland Highlands, and together the two communities make up much of what is known as south (unincorporated) Lakeland. The population was 8,892 at the 2010 census. The area is addressed to Lakeland, with zip codes 33811 and 33813.

Geography

According to the United States Census Bureau, the CDP has a total area of 5.7 square miles (14.7 km2), of which 5.7 square miles (14.7 km2) is land and 0.04 square mile (0.1 km2) (0.35%) is water.

History
A post office was established at Medulla in 1881, and remained in operation until 1909. Before the post office opened, the community was called Spring Hill. The name Medulla was given to the area due to its connecting link on the stagecoach rail-line between Bartow and Fort Meade, similar to how the medulla oblongata (in the lower part of the brain) connects with spinal cord. Medulla saw a period of rapid growth throughout the 1990s and early 2000s with development of Deer Brooke, a mega deed restricted community. Development of many other smaller subdivisions soon followed.

Demographics

As of the census of 2000, there were 6,637 people, 2,567 households, and 1,791 families residing in the CDP. The racial makeup of the CDP was 84.53% White, 11.65% African American, 0.03% Native American, 0.62% Asian, 0.02% Pacific Islander, 1.82% from other races, and 1.34% from two or more races. Hispanic or Latino of any race were 5.20% of the population.

There were 2,567 households, out of which 35.6% had children under the age of 18 living with them, 55.6% were married couples living together, 11.1% had a female householder with no husband present, and 30.2% were non-families. 23.9% of all households were made up of individuals, and 4.8% had someone living alone who was 65 years of age or older.  The average household size was 2.58 and the average family size was 3.06.

In the CDP, the population was spread out, with 26.4% under the age of 18, 9.7% from 18 to 24, 33.6% from 25 to 44, 22.0% from 45 to 64, and 8.3% who were 65 years of age or older.  The median age was 34 years.  For every 100 females, there were 99.7 males.  For every 100 females age 18 and over, there were 97.3 males.

The median income for a household in the CDP was $45,460, and the median income for a family was $51,691. Males had a median income of $35,698 versus $26,341 for females. The per capita income for the CDP was $21,459.  6.0% of the population and 4.2% of families were below the poverty line.  Out of the total population, 4.0% of those under the age of 18 and 7.4% of those 65 and older were living below the poverty line.

References

Census-designated places in Polk County, Florida
Unincorporated communities in Polk County, Florida